Demi-Leigh Tebow (née Nel-Peters; born 28 June 1995) is a South African model and beauty queen who was crowned Miss Universe 2017. She was crowned Miss South Africa 2017, and is the second Miss Universe winner from South Africa, following Margaret Gardiner who was crowned Miss Universe 1978.

Early life and education
Demi-Leigh Nel-Peters was born on 28 June 1995 in Sedgefield, Western Cape, to Bennie Peters and Anne-Marie Steenkamp. Her half-sister, Franje, had cerebellar agenesis, and Nel-Peters said that she was the most significant motivator in her life; Franje died on 4 May 2019, which Nel-Peters confirmed on her Instagram.

Nel-Peters graduated from North-West University in March 2017, a few days before winning the Miss South Africa 2017 competition. She is fluent in both English and Afrikaans.

Pageantry

Miss South Africa 2017
Nel-Peters began her pageantry career representing Western Cape in the Miss South Africa 2017 competition on 26 March 2017 which she won. As Miss South Africa, she had the right to represent South Africa in both Miss World 2017 and Miss Universe 2017, but since the dates of the two pageants coincided, she was sent only to Miss Universe, held in Las Vegas, Nevada.

Miss Universe 2017

In the final round Steve Harvey asked Nel-Peters, "What quality in yourself are you most proud of and how will you apply that quality to your time as Miss Universe?" She said: When asked about what she thought was the most important issue regarding women in the workplace, she said:

She went on to win the competition and was crowned Miss Universe 2017 by outgoing titleholder Iris Mittenaere. Nel-Peters is the second titleholder from South Africa; Margaret Gardiner won Miss Universe 1978.

Nel-Peters said during a segment at Miss Universe that she wants to use her self-defence workshops to help as many women as she can. This stems from an incident a month after she was crowned Miss South Africa, when  she was carjacked at Hyde Park. She handed over her car keys but was forced into her car by the carjackers. She punched one of them in the throat and managed to run away and get help.

In her capacity as Miss Universe, Nel-Peters visited the Philippines (twice), Indonesia (twice), Thailand (twice), France, Mexico (twice), Ecuador, India, Lebanon, Egypt, Malaysia, various cities in the United States, and her home country, South Africa.

Nel-Peters ended her reign on 17 December 2018 in Bangkok, Thailand, the host nation of the 67th Miss Universe pageant. She eventually crowned Catriona Gray of the Philippines as her successor.

Personal life
During her reign as Miss Universe 2017, Nel-Peters began dating Tim Tebow, a former professional American football quarterback and former professional baseball outfielder for the New York Mets minor league affiliates. Nel-Peters and Tebow became engaged on 9 January 2019 at Tebow's family farm in Jacksonville, Florida. They married on 20 January 2020 in Franschhoek, Western Cape, about an hour outside of Cape Town. Like Tebow, she is a Christian.

References

External links

Official website
Profile of Nel-Peters at the official Miss South Africa website

1995 births
Living people
Afrikaner people
Cape Coloureds
Miss South Africa winners
Miss Universe 2017 contestants
Miss Universe winners
North-West University alumni
People from Knysna Local Municipality
South African beauty pageant winners
South African Christians
South African female models
South African women's rights activists